Inter-collegiate policy debate is a form of speech competition involving two teams of two debaters from different colleges or universities based on a resolution phrased as something the United States federal government "should" do. Policy debate also exists as a high school activity, with a very similar format, but different leagues, tournaments, speech times, resolutions, and styles.

Format
Each round is divided into four 9-minute constructive speeches, each followed by a 3-minute cross-examination period, then four 6-minute rebuttal speeches. The two sides alternate, with the affirmative getting the first and last speeches of the round and the negative getting the last constructive and the first rebuttal in the middle. Most affirmative teams present a specific policy option, or plan, as a normative defence of the resolution. However, some teams partake in alternative forms of debate, including performance, personal advocacies, or otherwise critical approaches. Negatives have several options for response, including solvency arguments against the effectiveness of the plan, external policy disadvantages, opportunity-cost-based counterplans, arguments stemming from debate theory such as the failure of the affirmative to advocate the resolution, and critical approaches. Argument is highly evidence-based, with numerous lengthy excerpts from books and articles read by each side. Speeches are often very fast, so much so as to be incomprehensible to people who are not used to the style.

Governing organizations
Inter-collegiate policy debate has been historically overseen by the National Debate Tournament (NDT), the Cross Examination Debate Association (CEDA), and, especially in the mid-Atlantic region, the American Debate Association (ADA).  Since 1996-97 these organizations have shared a common topic, and have become largely unified.  They nonetheless continue to host their own national championships.

Other organizations that sponsor policy debate, albeit with different rules, are the National Educational Debate Association (NEDA) and
the National Forensics Association's Lincoln Douglas (NFA-LD) debate (a policy variant of the high school LD format, which is less commonly practiced in colleges and universities).

Differences with high school debate
Inter-collegiate and high school policy debate are largely similar. Some of the differences:

High school debate has its own, separate, leagues and tournaments.
High school constructives are typically only 8 minutes, and high school rebuttals are typically only 5 minutes. College times are typically 9 minute constructives and 6 minute rebuttals.
Each year, the high school resolution is different from the college policy resolution.

Experienced college debaters often act as paid coaches, judges, and summer-camp counselors for high school policy debaters.

Notes

Policy debate